Wentworth is a small estate style community in southwest Calgary, Alberta.  The unique features of Wentworth are its architectural treatment, tree coverage and ample green space.  The community was developed between 2002 and 2008 and is home to under 1000 people.  The community is composed of five units:  Wentworth, The Willows of Wentworth, Wentworth Estates, Wexford Estates (now being built) and Wentworth Glen (under development).  

Wentworth is contained within the larger community area of West Springs.   

Wentworth was developed by Dundee developments except for the area of Wexford, which is being developed by the 7S Group.

Springside is an area adjacent to Wentworth.  Although not officially part of Wentworth, Springside contains many streets by the same name.

History
The zoning for the area was established by the East Springbank Area Structure Plan.

Components
 The main area of Wentworth features a variety of single family homes on standard sized lots as well as several multi family condominium and townhouse buildings.
 The Willows of Wentworth is a unique estate area of luxury homes where the natural aspen forest has been protected via a bare land condominium.
 Wentworth Estates is a newer area of estate homes on large lots.  Wexford is an extension of this area.
 Wentworth Glen is the final phase of Wentworth.  This area will likely feature mostly higher density housing.

Geography
Plant hardiness zone: 2b 

Education
Wentworth is served by several public and private schools, including:
 Calgary Catholic School District
 Calgary French and International School
 Webber Academy
 Calgary Waldorf School 
 West Springs School

Shopping
 Westpointe Shopping Centre, coming soon on 85th St.  in Montreux. Proposed uses to include: convenience store, financial institution, medical & dental, and community-focused retail services.    
 Aspen Landing Shopping Centre, mostly built in 2009 on 85th St. at 17th Ave.  Aspen Landing includes a Safeway, Broken Plate Restaurant, Subway, TD Bank, Scotiabank, Shoppers Drug Mart, and a Good Earth coffee shop.  Other tenants TBA.
 West Springs Village, a modestly upscale shopping complex featuring a Shoppers Drug Mart with Western Canada's largest beauty boutique, Sweet Grass Market Local Foods, Starbucks, Blink Eyewear, Fergus & Bix Restaurant & Beer Market, Time Music Studio, Urban Venus Nail Bar, Beaners, Alive Danceworks, Wentworth Health Group including Wentworth Family Dental, Wentworth Medical & Walk-In Clinic and Wentworth Skin & Laser Centre and others. 
 Co-Op Grocery Store, Gas Bar, Liquor Store.  Tim Hortons Located Nearby. 
 West Springs Gate is planned at 85th & 9th Ave.  This will be a "Garrison Woods" style mixed use commercial and residential building. http://www.wscr.ca/downloads/2007_wsg/siteplan.pdf

Churches
 Calgary Free Methodist Church.  http://www.westspringsfmc.ca
 St. Michaels' Catholic Church will be constructed on 85th St.  http://www.wscr.ca/downloads/2007_smc/siteplan.pdf
 St. Martin's Anglican Church. http://www.stmartinscalgary.ca

See also
List of neighbourhoods in Calgary

References

External links
 Wentworth Resident's Association Web Site
 West Springs Cougar Ridge Community Association
 City of Calgary. East Springbank Area Structure Plan

Neighbourhoods in Calgary